Herbert Watson may refer to:
 Herbert Watson (footballer), English football right half
 Herbert Gilles Watson, Australian flying ace
 H. E. Watson, professor of chemical engineering